In railway terminology, a single is a steam locomotive with a single pair of driving wheels.  Some sources use 'Single' only for the 2-2-2 type, also known as a Jenny Lind locomotive, but more commonly singles could have any number of leading or trailing wheels.

See also
 Crampton locomotive
 GWR 3031 Class
 GNR Stirling 4-2-2

References
  illustrated description of some famous singles

Steam locomotive types